Väimela Mäejärv is a lake in Estonia's southeastern county of Võru, near to the borders of Latvia and Russia.

See also
List of lakes of Estonia

Lakes of Estonia
Võru Parish
Lakes of Võru County